HD 155233 b is a confirmed exoplanet orbiting around the K Giant star HD 155233 every 885 days some 244.94 light-years away. It has a mass of 636 Earth masses or 2 Jupiter masses and is likely a gas giant similar of that to Jupiter just double the mass. It was discovered by Wittenmyer et al. on October 22nd 2015.

Planetary orbit and mass were refined in 2016.

References

Giant planets
Exoplanets discovered in 2015
Exoplanets detected by radial velocity
Ophiuchus (constellation)